Los Reyes Acozac is a community that belongs to the municipality of Tecámac in the State of Mexico in Mexico. It has a population of 20,478 inhabitants and is located at an altitude of 2,250 meters above sea level. The area is known for significant deposits of mammoth bones.

References

Populated places in the State of Mexico
Tecámac